Atodiresei is a Romanian surname. Notable people with the surname include:

Cosmin Atodiresei (born 1994), Romanian luger
Ion Atodiresei (born 1952), Romanian footballer
Ionuț Atodiresei (born 1981), Romanian kickboxer

Romanian-language surnames